Theta Kappa Pi is a regional sorority with a foundation built on friendship, service and integrity that was founded at Penn State University on February 13, 1984. Members of Theta Kappa Pi hold high standards of scholastic performance while working to enhance the college experience for all students and give back to the community at large.

History 
On October 23, 1987, the Beta chapter of Theta Kappa Pi was established under the direction of 9 founding sisters at the University of Charleston in Charleston, West Virginia. In 1988, the Alpha chapter merged with the Beta chapter to form a regional sorority. In February 2002, these two chapters merged with a newly founded Gamma chapter at Lewis University in Romeoville, Illinois.

Alpha chapter deactivation 
After 21 years as an active chapter of Theta Kappa Pi at Penn State University, the Alpha chapter decided to accept membership in Phi Mu National Fraternity.  On September 18, 2005, the executive board of the Alpha chapter of TKP, the current members of the Beta Mu chapter of Phi Mu, and four representatives of the Phi Mu National Organization met at Penn State's University Park campus to discuss a possible merger of the two organizations. Concluding the presentation, 67 members of TKP were offered a blanket bid to join Phi Mu. On Tuesday, September 20, 2005, 65 of the 67 TKP members accepted this invitation. A ribboning ceremony was later conducted for the new members of Phi Mu on September 29, 2005. The new members then participated in the national Phi Mu new member program under the direction of full-time Phi Mu leadership consultant, Allie Kearns.

The decision to merge the two organizations was the result of many different factors. At the time, Phi Mu had struggled with a lack of interested potential members but possessed the national backing of a National Panhellenic Conference sorority. Meanwhile, TKP had the membership numbers but sought the legitimacy and national backing. The decision to merge offered the two organizations a quick solution to these issues.

Philanthropy 
As a sorority focused on service, Theta Kappa Pi is dedicated to their philanthropy as women against domestic violence. Theta Kappa Pi works closely with the Guardian Angel Community Services in order to raise awareness for and prevent domestic violence. Members of Theta Kappa Pi also strive to provide service to all areas of the community outside of this cause with regular participation in events which benefit many different organizations that include but are not limited to: Guardian Angel Community Services Feed My Starving Children, Trick or Treat for UNICEF, March of Dimes, Habitat for Humanity, American Heart Association, American Cancer Society, Feed the Homeless and volunteering at retirement homes.

Chapters

References

Fraternities and sororities in the United States
1984 establishments in Pennsylvania
Student organizations established in 1984